Pseudoruegeria lutimaris is a Gram-negative, rod-shaped and non-motile bacterium from the genus of Pseudoruegeria which has been isolated from tidal flat sediments from Hwang-do in Korea.

References 

Rhodobacteraceae
Bacteria described in 2010